Yuri Kuznetsov (Russian Юрий Кузнецов, born 31 January 1965) is a Russian former ice hockey player.

Career

Early career in Russia 

Finland 
After one year in Swedish Elitserien, he joined HIFK in the SM-liiga, where he played for 3 seasons. At the beginning of the 1997–1998 season he moved to SaiPa where Kuznetsov stayed for nearly five seasons. During the middle of the 2001–02 season, Kuznetsov left SaiPa and returned to his homeland and the Lokomotiv Yaroslavl after nine years spent abroad.

Overall, Kuznetsov played in 388 matches in SM-liiga and scored 53 goals, 119 assists and 172 points. He collected 305 penalty minutes. Kuznetsov belonged to the best defenders of the league, scoring 36 points in each of the seasons 1999–2000 and 2000–2001.

Retirement 
After half of a season in Russia, Kuznetsov returned to Finland to play the 2002–2003 season for Hokki in Mestis, which was the final year of his career.

Career statistics

See also 
 Kuznetsov should not be confused with Yuri Kuznetsov (b. Novosibirsk 1971), Russian ice hockey left wing who played for Russia in the 2001 IIHF World Championship.

References

External links
 

1965 births
Ice hockey people from Moscow
Russian ice hockey defencemen
Soviet ice hockey defencemen
Living people
Hokki players
Krylya Sovetov Moscow players
IF Björklöven players
HIFK (ice hockey) players
SaiPa players
Lokomotiv Yaroslavl players